Terpentetriene synthase (EC 4.2.3.36, Cyc2) is an enzyme with systematic name terpentedienyl-diphosphate diphosphate-lyase (terpentetriene-forming). This enzyme catalyses the following chemical reaction

 terpentedienyl diphosphate  terpentetriene + diphosphate

This enzyme requires Mg2+ for maximal activity but can use Mn2+, Fe2+ or Co2+ to a lesser extent.

References

External links 
 

EC 4.2.3